Trygve Stangeland (13 November 1934 – 18 June 2011) was a Norwegian businessperson.

He was born in Sola, and founded the construction company Stangeland Gruppen in 1959.

He resided in Tjelta. His son Olav Stangeland is the director of Stangeland Gruppen's daughter company, T. Stangeland Maskin.

On 17 June 2011 he was involved in a bicycle accident near the airport hotel at Stavanger Airport, Sola, and sustained a severe head trauma. The injury claimed his life; he died on Stavanger University Hospital in the afternoon the next day.

References

1934 births
2011 deaths
People from Sola, Norway
Norwegian company founders
Road incident deaths in Norway